In mathematical economics, an isoelastic function, sometimes constant elasticity function, is a function that exhibits a constant elasticity, i.e. has a constant elasticity coefficient. The elasticity is the ratio of the percentage change in the dependent variable to the percentage causative change in the independent variable, in the limit as the changes approach zero in magnitude. 

For an elasticity coefficient  (which can take on any real value), the function's general form is given by

The elasticity is by definition

which for this function simply equals r.

Derivation 
Elasticity of demand is indicated by 

,

where r is the elasticity, Q is quantity, and P is price.

Rearranging gets us:

Then integrating

Simplify

Examples

Demand functions

An example in microeconomics is the constant elasticity demand function, in which p is the price of a product and D(p) is the resulting quantity demanded by consumers. For most goods the elasticity r (the responsiveness of quantity demanded to price) is negative, so it can be convenient to write the constant elasticity demand function with a negative sign on the exponent, in order for the coefficient  to take on a positive value:

where  is now interpreted as the unsigned magnitude of the responsiveness.
An analogous function exists for the supply curve.

Utility functions in the presence of risk

The constant elasticity function is also used in the theory of choice under risk aversion, which usually assumes that risk-averse decision-makers maximize the expected value of a concave von Neumann-Morgenstern utility function. In this context, with a constant elasticity of utility with respect to, say, wealth, optimal decisions on such things as shares of stocks in a portfolio are independent of the scale of the decision-maker's wealth. The constant elasticity utility function in this context is generally written as

See also
 Constant elasticity of substitution
 Power function

References

External links
 Constant Elasticity Demand and Supply Curves

Mathematical economics